Marmaduke Constable-Maxwell, 11th Lord Herries of Terregles,  (4 October 1837 – 5 October 1908) was Lord Lieutenant of the East Riding of Yorkshire from 1880 and Lord-Lieutenant of Kirkcudbrightshire from 1885 until his death.

He was educated at Stonyhurst. In 1875, he married the Hon. Angela Mary Charlotte Fitzalan-Howard, the 2nd daughter of the 1st Lord Howard of Glossop: they had two daughters.

Gwendolen became the second wife of the 15th Duke of Norfolk.;
 Hon. Angela Mary Constable-Maxwell who married Eric Drummond, 7th Earl of Perth.

References

People educated at Stonyhurst College
1837 births
1908 deaths
Herries, Marmaduke Constable Maxwell, 1st Baron
Lord-Lieutenants of the East Riding of Yorkshire
Lord-Lieutenants of Kirkcudbright
Lords Herries of Terregles
Marmaduke
Peers of the United Kingdom created by Queen Victoria